Andaingo (also Andaingo Gara) is a rural municipality in Madagascar. It belongs to the district of Moramanga, which is a part of Alaotra-Mangoro Region. The population of the commune was 19656 in 2018.

Primary and junior level secondary education are available in town. The majority 85% of the population of the commune are farmers.  The most important crop is rice, while other important products are cassava and taro.  Services provide employment for 15% of the population.

Gare
Andaingo Gara has a railway station on the Moramanga - Alaotra Lake line.

Power station
There is a biofuel thermal power station in Andaingo. It has a capacity of 75 kw.

See also
Ambodirano, a village of this municipality.

References

Populated places in Alaotra-Mangoro